"Every Little Thing" is a song by Jeff Lynne release as a lead single from his first solo album Armchair Theatre.

The single was released on 12" and CD and featured an extended version of the song and non-album track "I'm Gone". Fellow Traveling Wilburys members George Harrison and Tom Petty made cameo appearances in the Meiert Avis–directed music video that received rotation on VH1 at the time.

"Every Little Thing" flopped in the UK (number 59) and charted at number 9 on Billboards Mainstream Rock Tracks chart in the US. It also charted at number 31 in Australia.

Track listing
All songs written by Jeff Lynne.

7"
"Every Little Thing" – 3:44
"I'm Gone" –  2:50

12", CD
"Every Little Thing" (12" Remix) – 7:56
"Every Little Thing" – 3:44
"I'm Gone" – 2:50

Charts

Weekly charts

Year-end charts

References

1990 singles
Song recordings produced by Jeff Lynne
Jeff Lynne songs
Songs written by Jeff Lynne
1990 songs
Reprise Records singles
Music videos directed by Meiert Avis